Justiniana Prima (Latin: ,) was an Eastern Roman city that existed from 535 to 615, and currently an archaeological site, known as or Caričin Grad, near modern Lebane in the Leskovac region, southern Serbia. It was founded by Emperor Justinian I (527-565) and served as the metropolitan seat of the then newly founded Archbishopric of Justiniana Prima, which became the main church administrative body of the central and western Balkans with jurisdiction from Praevalitana to Dacia Ripensis Justinian Prima was originally designed to become the capital of the prefecture of Illyricum, but for reasons likely related with its status near the Roman frontiers of the 6th century CE, Thessaloniki was preferred. It was abandoned less than 100 years after its foundation.

In 1979, the archaeological site of Justiniana Prima (Caričin Grad) was added to the Archaeological Sites of Exceptional Importance-list under official protected status by the Republic of Serbia.

History

The city was founded by Emperor Justinian I in 535. It existed until 615 and was designed as the seat of the Archbishopric of Justiniana Prima. The arch-priest of the Illyrians ('Ιλλυριών άρχιερεύς) seated in Justinian Prima had jurisdiction over Dacia Ripensis, Dacia Mediterranea, northern Moesia Superior, Dardania, Macedonia Salutaris, Praevalitana and the territory of Bassianae in Pannonia Secunda.  The establishment of the Archbishopric is mentioned in Justinian's own Novel XI from 535, when he promotes the Metropolitan to an Archbishop, independent from the Archbishop of Thessalonica. The establishment is seen as part of the feud between Justinian and the Archbishop of Eastern Illyricum, who was a papal vicar. 
The city was to become capital of Illyricum, but Thessaloniki was preferred and Justinian Prima received jurisdiction over the territories of the Diocese of Dacia. Still, the new foundation was not without importance and Justinian made sure that this city, which was one of his favourite projects, received all the necessary support. In 545 Justinian issued another law underlining the episcopal rights and status of Justiniana Prima, which is also confirmed by letters that were exchanged between Justinian and Pope Gregory I at the end of the 6th century.

The city planning combined classical and Christian elements: thermae, a levantine agorai, and streets with colonnades. Typical Eastern Mediterranean features went along with numerous churches. Procopius, in his The Buildings, describes the city as follows:

The town was abandoned at around 615. Invading Avars coming from north of the Danube may be one factor, missing political interest in the town after the time of Justinian may be another. Among many other imported finds the presence of 2 pieces of a specific type of fibulae and handmade pottery have been understood as an indication of the presence of Slavs already before the Avar incursion.

Archaeological site
The huge correlation between the archaeological site and the description by Procopius as well as finds of seals of the bishop of Iustiniana Prima have determined the identification of Justiniana Prima with Caričin Grad.  There have been archaeological excavations for nearly 100 years with the participation of French and more recently also German researchers. There is a permanent exhibition in the national museum in Leskovac. At the site itself monuments there are impressive remains of the fortification, the acropolis as well as of several churches and many other buildings.

See also
 Archbishopric of Justiniana Prima
 Praetorian prefecture of Illyricum
 Archaeological Sites of Exceptional Importance (Serbia)

References

Sources

 William Bowden (2003), "Theory and practice in late antique archaeology", pp. 207–220, BRILL.
 
 
 
 
 
 
 
 
 Vujadin Ivanišević, Caričin Grad / Justiniana Prima (Serbia) – excavations in a Byzantine city of the 6th century A.D.

External links 

 Caričin Grad – Iustiniana Prima, archaeological site - UNESCO
 3-D animation Justiniana Prima
 Justiniana Prima on YouTube
 Zooarchaeology: Bones of Camel Discovered at site of Caričin Grad - Justiniana Prima (In Serbian) on YouTube

Populated places established in the 6th century
Byzantine Serbia
Byzantine sites in Serbia
6th century in the Byzantine Empire
7th century in the Byzantine Empire
6th century in Serbia
7th century in Serbia
Buildings of Justinian I
Archaeological Sites of Exceptional Importance
610s in the Byzantine Empire
Basilica churches in Serbia
Byzantine sacred architecture
Palaeo-Christian architecture